Fabrizio Ruggeri is an Italian statistician. He is Research Director at the National Research Council Istituto di matematica applicata e tecnologie informatiche (CNR-IMATI) in Milan, Italy. His work focusses on Bayesian methods, specifically robustness and stochastic process inference. He has done innovative work on sensitivity of Bayesian methods and incompletely specified priors. He has worked on Bayesian wavelet methods, and on a vast variety of applications to industrial problems. His publications include well over 150 refereed papers and book chapters, as well as five books.

Ruggeri received his PhD from Duke University in 1994. He is an Elected Member of the International Statistical Institute and a Fellow of the American Statistical Association, the International Society for Bayesian Analysis (ISBA) and the Institute of Mathematical Statistics. He is the first recipient of the Zellner Medal by ISBA. He was President of the International Society for Bayesian Analysis in 2012 and the European Network for Business and Industrial Statistics in 2005-6, and is currently President of the International Society for Business and Industrial Statistics and Vice-President of the International Statistical Institute. He is Editor-in-Chief of Applied Stochastic Models in Business and Industry and of Statistics Reference Online.

Publications
Kenett, R., Ruggeri, F. and Faltin, F. Eds. (2018), Analytic Methods in Systems and Software Testing, Wiley, Chichester, UK. 
Rios Insua, D., Ruggeri, F. and Wiper, M. (2012), Bayesian Analysis of Stochastic Processes Models, Wiley, Chichester, UK. 
Faltin, F., Kenett, R. and Ruggeri, F. Eds. (2012), Statistical Methods in Healthcare Practice, Wiley, Chichester, UK.
Rios Insua, D. and Ruggeri, F. Eds. (2000), Robust Bayesian Analysis, Lecture Notes in Statistics, vol. 152, Springer, New York, USA. 
Berger, J., Betrò, B., Moreno, E., Pericchi, L.R., Ruggeri, F., Salinetti, G. and Wasserman, L. Eds. (1996), Bayesian Robustness, Lecture Notes IMS, vol. 29, Institute of Mathematical Statistics, Hayward, USA.

References 

Duke University alumni
Italian statisticians
Year of birth missing (living people)
Elected Members of the International Statistical Institute
Fellows of the American Statistical Association
Living people